The Highland Park Historic District in Denver, Colorado is a  historic district which was listed on the National Register of Historic Places in 1985.  It has also been known as Scottish Village.

The district is bounded by Zuni St., Dunkeld Pl., Clay St., and 32nd Ave.

References

Historic districts on the National Register of Historic Places in Colorado
National Register of Historic Places in Denver
Buildings and structures completed in 1874